"Controversy" is a song by American musician Prince, the lead single and title track to his 1981 album. The song addresses speculation about Prince at the time such as his sexuality, gender, religion, and racial background, and how he could not understand the curiosity surrounding him.

Background
The song has two main verses, a few choruses, with the title repeated throughout the track. Towards the middle he recites the Lord's Prayer in full, which fueled the fire for some to say the song was blasphemous. Toward the end is a repeating chant of "People call me rude / I wish we all were nude / I wish there was no black and white / I wish there were no rules." The song features a steady 4/4 drumbeat, synthesized bass, guitar, and keyboards. The song was backed with "When You Were Mine", from his previous album, Dirty Mind.

On November 29, 1993, in support of The Hits/The B-Sides, "Controversy" was once again released in the UK as a single, this time as a two-disc EP containing several hits not on the collection. CD1 includes the edit of "Controversy", the William Orbit remix of "The Future", "Glam Slam", and "D.M.S.R.". CD2 includes the edit of "Controversy", "Anotherloverholenyohead", "Paisley Park", and "New Power Generation (Part II)". Like the "Peach" single, CD1 was a special foldout package with a placeholder for CD2, which was sold separately. "Controversy" was also released on a 7-inch picture disc. It reached number five on the UK charts in December 1993.

"Controversy" is considered Prince's breakthrough hit in Australia, where it peaked at number 15. In the US, "Controversy" peaked at number three on the Soul Singles chart and number 70 on the Billboard Hot 100. Also, along with the track, "Let's Work", "Controversy" was the first of seven number ones on the dance chart for Prince.

Live in Hawaii
"Controversy (Live in Hawaii)" is a digital single made available for sale on Prince's website on March 29, 2004.  The single consists of a live performance of the song: "Controversy", recorded on tour in Hawaii in 2003.  The track also saw a limited release as a CD single, only available as part of a Prince in Hawaii Gift Box, available from Prince's retail outlet.

Charts

Weekly charts

Year-end charts

References

1981 singles
1981 songs
1993 singles
2004 singles
Music videos directed by Bruce Gowers
Prince (musician) songs
Song recordings produced by Prince (musician)
Songs written by Prince (musician)
Warner Records singles